Ellis Road is a road close to the city centre of Singapore. It is accessible only by Tanglin Road, and provides access to The Regent Hotel.

History
Ellis Road used to be the access road to a cluster of Malay kampong (hamlet or village) houses. It was referred to by the local Malays as Kampong Tanglin Ellis Road. The village had their own mosque that was demolished in the 1970s to make way for modern commercial buildings.

Roads in Singapore